Juan Luis Martínez Holger (7 July 1942 – 29 March 1993) was a Chilean avant-garde poet, writer, and visual artist.

Chilean male poets
Chilean people of Norwegian descent
1942 births
1993 deaths
20th-century Chilean poets
20th-century Chilean male writers